Gibberula thomensis is a species of sea snail, a marine gastropod mollusk, in the family Cystiscidae.

References

thomensis
Gastropods described in 1919